Weippe is a city in Clearwater County, Idaho, United States. The population was 441 at the 2010 census, up from 411 in 2000. In September 1805, the starving Lewis and Clark Expedition first met the Nez Perce on the Weippe Prairie, south of the city.

Geography

Demographics

2010 census
At the 2010 census there were 441 people in 198 households, including 121 families, in the city. The racial makup of the city was 98.4% White, 0.7% Native American, 0.2% Asian, 0.2% from other races, and 0.5% from two or more races. Hispanic or Latino of any race were 1.8%.

Of the 198 households, 24.2% had children under the age of 18 living with them, 46.0% were married couples living together, 11.1% had a female householder with no husband present, 4.0% had a male householder with no wife present, and 38.9% were non-families. 31.3% of households were one person, and 16.2% were one person aged 65 or older. The average household size was 2.23 and the average family size was 2.77.

The median age was 48.4 years. 20.9% of residents were under the age of 18; 6% were between the ages of 18 and 24; 17.4% were from 25 to 44; 32% were from 45 to 64; and 23.6% were 65 or older. The gender makeup of the city was 48.5% male and 51.5% female.

2000 census
At the 2000 census there were 416 people in 161 households, including 119 families, in the city. The; racial makeup of the city was 97.12% White, 0.24% African American, 1.20% Native American, 0.72% from other races, and 0.72% from two or more races. Hispanic or Latino of any race were 0.96%.

Of the 161 households, 36.6% had children under the age of 18 living with them, 56.5% were married couples living together, 12.9% had a female householder with no husband present, and 25.5% were non-families. 20.5% of households were built up of individuals, and 10.6% were one person aged 65 or older.  The average household size was 2.58 and the average family size was 2.95.

The age distribution was 29.3% under the age of 18, 6.7% from 18 to 24, 22.1% from 25 to 44, 26.4% from 45 to 64, and 15.4% 65 or older.  The median age was 38 years. For every 100 females, there were 101.9 males.  For every 100 females age 18 and over, there were 90.9 males.

The median household income was $26,442 and the total income for a family was $28,281. Males had a median income of $30,694 versus $17,500 for females. The per capita income for the city was $13,175.  About 16.8% of families and 24.8% of the population were below the poverty line, including 36.3% of those under age 18 and 19.7% of those age 65 or over.

References

External links
 Weippe.com
 Chamber of Commerce - Pierce & Weippe, Idaho
 Tour the Inland NW.com - Pierce & Weippe
 Weippe Discovery Center

Cities in Clearwater County, Idaho
Cities in Idaho